Narain Prasad Gupta  was a member of Rajya Sabha of India from Madhya Pradesh. He was founding members of Jana Sangh and is a member of the Bharatiya Janata Party political party.

References

Living people
Bharatiya Janata Party politicians from Madhya Pradesh
Rajya Sabha members from Madhya Pradesh
Politicians from Bhopal
Bharatiya Jana Sangh politicians
Year of birth missing (living people)
Rajya Sabha members from the Bharatiya Janata Party